The history of electrophoresis for molecular separation and chemical analysis began with the work of Arne Tiselius in 1931, while new separation processes and chemical analysis techniques based on electrophoresis continue to be developed in the 21st century.  Tiselius, with support from the Rockefeller Foundation, developed the "Tiselius apparatus" for moving boundary electrophoresis, which was described in 1937 in the well-known paper "A New Apparatus for Electrophoretic Analysis of Colloidal Mixtures".  The method spread slowly until the advent of effective zone electrophoresis methods in the 1940s and 1950s, which used filter paper or gels as supporting media.  By the 1960s, increasingly sophisticated gel electrophoresis methods made it possible to separate biological molecules based on minute physical and chemical differences, helping to drive the rise of molecular biology.  Gel electrophoresis and related techniques became the basis for a wide range of biochemical methods, such as protein fingerprinting, Southern blot, other blotting procedures, DNA sequencing, and many more.

Electrophoresis before Tiselius

Early work with the basic principle of electrophoresis dates to the early 19th century, based on Faraday's laws of electrolysis proposed in the late 18th century and other early electrochemistry.  Experiments by Johann Wilhelm Hittorf, Walther Nernst, and Friedrich Kohlrausch to measure the properties and behavior of small ions moving through aqueous solutions under the influence of an electric field led to general mathematical descriptions of the electrochemistry of aqueous solutions.  Kohlrausch created equations for varying concentrations of charged particles moving through solution, including sharp moving boundaries of migrating particles.  By the beginning of the 20th century, electrochemists had found that such moving boundaries of charged particles could be created with U-shaped glass tubes.

Methods of optical detection of moving boundaries in liquids had been developed by August Toepler in the 1860s; Toepler measured the schlieren (shadows) or slight variations in optical properties that in inhomogeneous solutions.  This method combined with the theoretical and experimental methods for creating and analysing charged moving boundaries would form the basis of Tiselius's moving boundary electrophoresis method.

Development and spread of the Tiselius apparatus

The apparatus designed by Arne Tiselius enabled a range of new applications of electrophoresis in analyzing chemical mixtures.  Its development, significantly funded by the Rockefeller Foundation, was an extension of Tiselius's earlier PhD studies.  With more assistance from the Rockefeller Foundation, the expensive Tiselius apparatus was built at a number of major centers of chemical research.

Rise of zone electrophoresis

By the late 1940s, new electrophoresis methods were beginning to address some of the shortcomings of the moving boundary electrophoresis of the Tiselius apparatus, which was not capable of completely separating electrophoretically similar compounds.  Rather than charged molecules moving freely through solutions, the new methods used solid or gel matrices to separate compounds into discrete and stable bands (zones); in 1950 Tiselius dubbed these methods "zone electrophoresis".

Zone electrophoresis found widespread application in biochemistry after Oliver Smithies introduced starch gel as an electrophoretic substrate in 1955.  Starch gel (and later polyacrylamide and other gels) enabled the efficient separation of proteins, making it possible with relatively simple technology to analyze complex protein mixtures and identify minute differences in related proteins.

Widespread application

Since the 1950s, electrophoresis methods have diversified considerably, and new methods and applications are still being developed as 
Affinity electrophoresis, Capillary electrophoresis, Electroblotting, Electrophoretic mobility shift assay, Isotachophoresis, Pulsed-field gel electrophoresis, and Preparative electrophoresis.

See also
Electrophoresis
History of chromatography
History of molecular biology
History of biochemistry
Journal of Electrophoresis

Notes

References
 Vesterberg, Olof (1989).  "History of Electrophoretic Methods", Journal of Chromatography, volume 480, pp. 3–19.

Electrophoresis
Electrophoresis